Athletes from Spain have competed at the Paralympic Games since the 1968 Summer events and the country hosted the 1992 Summer Paralympics.  Competitors have represented Spain in ten of the twelve Summer Paralympics, missing only the first two events in Rome and Tokyo.

Spain's breakthrough year came in 1992 when they hosted the event; their medal tally rocketed with a level of performance that would be maintained for the following two events.  The 2000 Summer Paralympics in Sydney saw their greatest achievements at the Games but the medal victories were overshadowed by a cheating controversy that would change the way that intellectually disabled competitors were tested for their disability (see Cheating at the Paralympic Games).

Teams 
Traditionally, Spain has sent three times as many male competitors as female competitors.  At the same time, women have won 48.39% of all Spain's Paralympic medals compared to 24.32% for men.

Multi medalists 
Spanish athletes who have won at least three gold medals or five medals.

Medal tallies

Summer Paralympics

Winter Paralympics

Medals by summer sport

Medals by winter sport

See also
Spain at the Olympics
Spain at the Deaflympics

References